Wahipora is a Notifed Area and a village in Langate tehsil of Kupwara district in union territory of Jammu and Kashmir, India.

Geography 
It is surrounded by Rafiabad tehsil towards the South, Lolab towards the North, Zaingair tehsil towards the East, Langate and Handwara towards the West. Sopore, Baramulla and Srinagar are the closest cities.

Economy 
People of the village are mainly dependent on agriculture and horticulture. There are two public sector bank branches in the village viz The Jammu and Kashmir bank and Grameen bank.

References

Villages in Kupwara district